Ingram Hill is an American rock band from Memphis, Tennessee, United States.

History
In the summer of 2000, after attending the University of Memphis, childhood friends Justin Moore (lead vocals, rhythm guitar) and Phil Bogard (lead guitar) joined with Shea Sowell (bass, background vocals) and Matt Chambless (drums) to form the band.  They spent much of the next year and a half touring throughout the south and southeast.  They played their first show August 23, 2000, in Oxford, Mississippi.

In 2002, the band released an EP, Until Now, on Traveler Records, an independent label.  The lead singer of Tonic, Emerson Hart, produced five of the tracks on Until Now.  As a result of the band's touring efforts  with bands such as Hootie & the Blowfish, over 10,000 copies of Until Now were sold throughout the country.

Ingram Hill's first full-length album, June's Picture Show was produced by Rick Beato (Charlie Mars, Shinedown, and others).  Intended as an independent release, Hollywood Records later re-released the album as part of a new major label deal. Released in February 2004, two tracks from June's Picture Show have become Billboard Adult Contemporary Hits: "Will I Ever Make it Home" and "Almost Perfect."  Ingram Hill continues to tour, appearing both as headline act and support for artists including Maroon 5, Guster, Better than Ezra, Lisa Marie Presley, and Hanson.

The band also performed a cover of Boston's "More Than A Feeling" for the "Herbie" soundtrack.

In 2010, Justin Moore was featured in Memphis sports radioman Chris Vernon's song, "Runaway Lane," a parody of former University of Tennessee Head Coach Lane Kiffin.

Members
Current
Justin Moore - vocals, guitar
Phil Bogard - guitar
Zach Kirk - bass, vocals

Touring bandmates
Chris Allen - guitar, strings
Shawn Zorn - drums
Sam Mogerman - drums

Former
Matt Chambless - drums
Shea Sowell - bass

Discography

Studio albums

Extended plays

Singles

See also 
Killer Queen: A Tribute to Queen

References

External links
 Ingram Hill's Myspace
 Ingram Hill's Official Website

Alternative rock groups from Tennessee
Hollywood Records artists
Rock Ridge Music artists
American pop rock music groups
Musical groups from Memphis, Tennessee